The 2014–15 season was Burnley's first season back in the Premier League in four years after gaining promotion in the previous season. They also competed in the League Cup and the FA Cup.

Match details

Premier League

League table

Matches

FA Cup

League Cup

Appearances and goals
Source:
Numbers in parentheses denote appearances as substitute.
Players with names struck through and marked  left the club during the playing season.
Players with names in italics and marked * were on loan from another club with Burnley.
Key to positions: GK – Goalkeeper; DF – Defender; MF – Midfielder; FW – Forward

Transfers

In

Out

Loans in

Loans out

See also
List of Burnley F.C. seasons

References

2014–15
Burn